Henry Taylor (1881 – 27 May 1917) was a Scottish professional footballer who played as a right half in the Scottish League for Dundee Hibernian and Falkirk.

Personal life 
Taylor worked as a brakesman for the Callandar Coal Company. He served as a private in the Gordon Highlanders during the First World War and was killed near Rœux on 27 May 1917. He was buried in Brown's Copse Cemetery, Rœux.

Career statistics

References 

Scottish footballers
1917 deaths
British Army personnel of World War I
British military personnel killed in World War I
1881 births
Scottish Football League players
King's Park F.C. players
Footballers from Falkirk
Gordon Highlanders soldiers
Dundee United F.C. players
Falkirk F.C. players
Scottish miners
Association football wing halves

Dundee F.C. players